Nilkanth Master is an Indian Marathi language film directed by Gajendra Ahire and produced by Meghmala Pathare under the banner of Akshar Films Pvt Ltd. The film stars Omkar Govardhan , Pooja Sawant , Adinath Kothare and Neha Mahajan. The film was released on 7 August 2015.

Synopsis 
Vishwanath joins a revolutionary group when he earns the trust of the leader, Vyenkatesh. When Vyenkatesh is killed in battle against the British, Vishwanath is tasked with going undercover as a teacher to convey the news to Vyankatesh's fiancée.

Cast 
 Omkar Govardhan as Vishwanath
 Adinath Kothare as Vyankatesh
 Neha Mahajan as Yashoda
 Pooja Sawant as Indu

Soundtrack

Critical response
Mihir Bhanage of The Times of India gave it 2 out of 5 stars, calling the film "The performances sustain the film but don’t salvage it. The hastiness shows as the plot goes haywire. Better editing and implementation of the story could’ve made this a good watch but alas, it’s not". Ganesh Matkari of Pune Mirror gave the film two and a half stars out of five and opining that "To sum it up, it is a mildly curious and yet annoying film, which starts off well but then gets lost. It’s not entirely a waste of time but keep your expectations in check". Soumitra Pote of Maharashtra Times rated the film 2.5 out of 5 stars and wrote "Art direction is also good. The point remains that if this was a love story, the bond between these three would have been much more fun if it had been explored separately keeping in mind the times". Jayanti Waghdhare of Zee News rated the film 2.5 out of 5 stars and wrote "One thing that strikes in the movie is that since Nilkanth Master is a love story, it is difficult to tell how much justice has been done to the story and its characters".

References

External links
 
 

2015 films
2010s Marathi-language films
Films scored by Ajay–Atul
Indian drama films
Indian romance films